The 2016 Baton Rouge mayoral election was held on November 8 and December 10, 2016, to elect the mayor-president of Baton Rouge, Louisiana.

Results

First round

Runoff

References 

2016 Louisiana elections
2016
Baton Rouge